Frank Luck (born 5 December 1967) is a former German and, before 1990, East German biathlete.

Career
Luck started early with cross-country skiing, but in 1980 he went over to biathlon. By 1988 at the age of 21 he had already qualified for the Winter Olympics in Calgary, where he finished sixth in the sprint event. His big breakthrough came with the 10 km sprint world title in 1989. Having originally competed for the East German team, by 1991, Germany had unified and Luck was now competing for the combined Germany team. Because of illness he missed the 1992 Winter Olympics in Albertville, but at the 1994 Winter Olympics in Lillehammer he won the gold medal with the German relay team which he repeated four years later at the 1998 Winter Olympics in Nagano. During his seventeen-year career, Luck won eleven world championship gold medal with the last one in the relay in 2004 at Oberhof where he retired as a biathlete after this event. With five silver and three bronze medals he is one of the most successful world championship competitors of all time.

Luck also won three times at the Holmenkollen ski festival biathlon competition with two wins in the pursuit (1999, 2000) and one win in the sprint (2002).
He is the Brother-in-law to his one-time teammate Sven Fischer.

Doping 
In April 2009, Luck, on the German TV show Sport Inside (WDR), acknowledged having unwittingly been given the anabolic steroid Oral Turinabol by his trainer in the 1980s.

Biathlon results
All results are sourced from the International Biathlon Union.

Olympic Games
5 medals (2 gold, 3 silver)

*Pursuit was added as an event in 2002.

World Championships
20 medals (11 gold, 5 silver, 4 bronze)

*During Olympic seasons competitions are only held for those events not included in the Olympic program.
**Team was removed as an event in 1998, and pursuit was added in 1997 with mass start being added in 1999.

Individual victories
12 victories (1 In, 9 Sp, 2 Pu)

*Results are from UIPMB and IBU races which include the Biathlon World Cup, Biathlon World Championships and the Winter Olympic Games.

References

External links

 Official website 
 

1967 births
Living people
People from Schmalkalden
Sportspeople from Thuringia
National People's Army military athletes
German male biathletes
Biathletes at the 1988 Winter Olympics
Biathletes at the 1994 Winter Olympics
Biathletes at the 1998 Winter Olympics
Biathletes at the 2002 Winter Olympics
Olympic biathletes of East Germany
Olympic biathletes of Germany
Medalists at the 1994 Winter Olympics
Medalists at the 1998 Winter Olympics
Medalists at the 2002 Winter Olympics
Olympic medalists in biathlon
Olympic silver medalists for Germany
Olympic gold medalists for Germany
Biathlon World Championships medalists
Holmenkollen Ski Festival winners
Doping cases in biathlon
German sportspeople in doping cases